Chayevo is a rural locality (a village) in Korotovskoye Rural Settlement, Cherepovetsky District, Vologda Oblast, Russia. The population was 128 as of 2002. There are 7 streets.

Geography 
Supronovo is the nearest rural locality.

References 

Rural localities in Cherepovetsky District